Ma Yansong (born in 1975 in Beijing) is a Chinese architect and founder of MAD architects. He serves as adjunct professor at School of Architecture, Tsinghua University, and the visiting professor at Beijing University of Civil Engineering and Architecture.

Early life and background
Ma Yansong was born in Beijing in 1975. He graduated from the Beijing University of Civil Engineering and Architecture, and holds a master's degree in Architecture from Yale University. He is currently a professor at the Beijing University of Civil Engineering and Architecture. During his master's degree in Yale, he first received attention for his project "Floating Islands". He founded MAD Architects in 2004.

Design philosophy: Shanshui City
The famous Chinese scientist Qian Xuesen proposed the concept of "Shanshui City" in the 1980s. In view of the emerging large-scale cement construction, he put forward a new model of urban development based on Chinese Shanshui spirit, which was meant to allow people to "stay out of nature and return to nature." However, this idealistic urban concept was not put into practice. As the world's largest manufacturing base, a large number of soulless "shelf cities" appeared in contemporary China due to the lack of cultural spirit. Qian Xuesen pointed out that modern cities' worship of power and capital leads to maximization and utilitarianism. "Buildings in cities should not become living machines. Even the most powerful technology and tools can never endow the city with a soul." 
To Ma Yansong, Shanshui does not just refer to nature; it is also the individual's emotional response to the surrounding world. "Shanshui City" is a combination of city density, functionality and the artistic conception of natural landscape. It aims at composing a future city that takes human spirit and emotion at their cores.

Signature Projects

Architecture
  Absolute Towers, Mississauga, Ontario, Canada, 2006–2012, completed 
Best Tall Buildings Americas, CTBUH "Council on Tall Buildings and Urban Habitat" 
No.1, Skyscraper Awards 2012, EMPORIS. 
Building of the Year 2012, ArchDaily.
Ordos Museum, Ordos, China, 2005–2011, completed 
Best Museum, UED
Winner of "Metal in Architecture", WAN Awards, 2014
Hongluo Clubhouse, Beijing, China, 2005–2006, completed
Sino-steel International Plaza, Tianjin, China, 2006 
Huangdu Art Center, Beijing, China, 2008 
Hutong Bubble 32, Beijing, China, 2008–2009, completed  
Fake Hills, Beihai, China 2008–2015, under construction
Best Architecture Multiple Residence, International Property Awards 
Harbin Opera House, Harbin, China, 2008–2015, under construction
Taichung Convention Center, Taiwan, 2009
Harbin China Wood Sculpture Museum, Harbin, China, 2009–2012, completed
Huangshan Mountain Village, Huangshan, China, 2009–2016, under construction
2012 Top 10 Conceptual Architecture, Designboom
Urban Forest, Chongqing, China, 2009
National Art Museum of China, Beijing, China, 2011
Pingtan Art Museum, Pingtan, China, 2011–2016
Chaoyang Park Mixed-use, Beijing, China, 2013–2016
D21 Chinese Architecture Design in 21st Century, Beijing Design Week 
Chinese Top 10 Buildings
Nanjing Zendai Himalayas Center, Nanjing, China, 2013–2017
Vertu, travelling Pavilion, Milan, Shanghai, Dubai, Beijing, London
Beijing 2050, Beijing, China
Rebuilt WTC, New York, USA
800m Tower, China
Changsha Culture Park, Changsha, China
KBH Kunsthal, Urban intervention, Copenhagen, Denmark
Lucas Museum of Narrative Art, Los Angeles, USA

Art

Shanshui - Experiment - Complex, Shenzhen, China, 2013
Moon Landscape, Beijing, China, 2013
"Shanshui City" Exhibition, Beijing, China, 2013
"Shansui City" for Audi City, Beijing, China
The Little Rock Fountain Journal
"The Floating Earth" for Alessi
Contemplating the Void in Guggenheim, New York, USA, 2009
Feelings are facts, Beijing, China, 2010
Monster's Footprint, Shenzhen, China, 2009
Superstar: A Mobile Chinatown (Uneternal City), Venice, Italy, 2008
Ink Ice, Beijing, China
Fish Tank

Awards and honors 
2018    Prix Versailles World Judge
2014    100 Most Creative People in Business, Fast Company
2014    Chaoyang Park Plaza: Chinese Top 10 Buildings 
2014    Sheraton Huzhou Hot Spring Resort: No.3, Skyscraper Awards 2013, EMPORIS 
2013    Designer of the Year, Good Design 
2013    D21 Young Chinese Architect Award
2013    Emporis for the world's best new skyscraper (Absolute Towers)
2013    2nd Audi Arts and Design Award in the category Designer of the Year 
2012    The Best New High-rise building in the America's by the CTBUH "Council on Tall Buildings and Urban Habitat", (Absolute Towers)
2012    International Property Awards (Fake Hills)
2011    UED museum award (Ordos Museum)
2011    RIBA International Fellowship
2011    Fast Company – one of 10 most innovative companies in China
2009    Fast Company – one of 10 creative people in architecture
2008    ICON magazine – one of 20 most influential young architects
2006    Architecture League Young Architects Award
2001    American Institute of Architects Scholarship for Advanced Architecture Research

Exhibitions
2014	Shanshui City Exhibition, Solo Exhibition, Ullens Center for Contemporary Art (UCCA), Beijing, China
2014	“The Changing Skyline”, Beijing Design Week, Beijing, China
2014	“Future Cities — High Mountain, Flowing Water” China Shan-Shui City Design Exhibition, Berlin, Germany
2014	Building M+: The Museum and Architecture Collection, Hong Kong, China
2013 	Shenzhen & Hong Kong Bi-City Biennale of Urbanism\Architecture, Shenzhen, China
2013         West Bund 2013: A Biennial of Architecture and Contemporary Art, Shanghai, China
2013      Palace of China – Architecture China 2013 exhibition, Segovia, Spain 
2013    Shanshui City Exhibition, Solo Exhibition, Beijing, China
2012       Between the Modernity and Tradition, Solo Exhibition, ICO Museum, Madrid, Spain
2011      Shenzhen & Hong Kong Bi-City Biennale of Urbanism\Architecture, Shenzhen, China
2011       Beijing Design week, Beijing, China
2011       Chengdu Biennale: Changing Vistas: Creative Duration, Chengdu, China
2011       Living, The Louisiana Museum of Modern Art, Copenhagen Denmark 
2011       Verso Est: Chinese Architectural Landscape, MAXXI, Rome, Italy
2010       Rising East: New Chinese Architecture, Vitra Design Museum, Weil am Rhein, Germany
2010       Feelings Are Facts, Olafur Eliasson+Ma Yansong, UCCA, Beijing, China
2009       Contemplating the Void: Interventions in the Guggenheim Museum, New York, USA
2008       Super Star, A Mobile China Town, Uneternal City, 11th Venice Architecture Exhibition, Italy
2008       China Design Now, Victoria and Albert Museum, London, UK
2007       MAD IN CHINA, solo exhibition, Danish Architecture Centre (DAC), Copenhagen, Denmark  
2006       Shanghai Art Biennale, Shanghai, China
2006      MAD IN CHINA, Solo exhibition, Diocesi Museum, Venice, Italy
2006  MAD Under Construction, Solo Exhibition, Tokyo Gallery, Beijing, China 
2004 1st Architecture Biennial Beijing, National Art Museum of China, Beijing, China

Quotes
 RIBA President Ruth Reed, in the jury report for the 2010 RIBA international Fellowship:
“Ma Yansong is a young Chinese architect – just 35 – who has come to architectural maturity at a time when his country is beginning to allow the freedom of expression so vital to the artist and sufficient freedom to the economy to allow
his ideas to be realized as buildings. His work expresses the tension between the individual imagination and the
needs of society as a whole."

References

Further reading
Instability-Craig Konyk,Anne Rieselbach,Architectural League of New York,Page 19
Conquering the west-Edwin Heathcote, Financial Times 
Without imagination there's no history, interview, in STUDIO Architecture and Urbanism magazine, issue#02 Original, Milano, Romolo Calabrese Ed., 2012 
 Sinuous 'Marilyn Monroe' towers shape city's future, CNN 
 An empathetic twist, domus

External links
 i-Mad

Chinese architects
Artists from Beijing
Living people
1975 births
21st-century Chinese architects
Yale University alumni
Yale School of Architecture alumni